Earl of Wemyss is a title in the Peerage of Scotland created in 1633. The Scottish Wemyss family had possessed the lands of Wemyss in Fife since the 12th century. Since 1823 the earldom has been held with the Earldom of March, created in 1697. The holder of the title is sometimes known as the Earl of Wemyss and March, but the titles are distinct.

History

In 1625 John Wemyss was created a Baronet, of Wemyss in the County of Fife, in the Baronetage of Nova Scotia. In 1628 he was raised to the Peerage of Scotland as Lord Wemyss of Elcho, and in 1633 he was further honoured when he was made Lord Elcho and Methel and Earl of Wemyss, also in the Peerage of Scotland. He later supported the Scottish parliament against Charles I, and died in 1649. He was succeeded by his son David, the second Earl.

In 1672 David resigned his peerages to the Crown in return for a new patent with original precedency and extending the limitation to his daughters. Lord Wemyss had no male issue and on his death in 1679 the baronetcy became extinct. He was succeeded in the peerages according to the new patent by his daughter Margaret, the third Countess of Wemyss. She married as her first husband her third cousin twice removed Sir James Wemyss, Lord Burntisland. He was the son of General Sir James Wemyss of Caskieberry, grandson of James Wemyss, younger brother of Sir John Wemyss, great-grandfather of the first Earl of Wemyss. She was succeeded by her son from her first marriage, David, the fourth Earl. He served as Lord High Admiral of Scotland and sat in the House of Lords as a Scottish Representative Peer from 1707 to 1710. Lord Wemyss married Lady Anne Douglas, daughter of William Douglas, 1st Duke of Queensberry and sister of William Douglas, 1st Earl of March (see below).

On his death the titles passed to his second but eldest surviving son James, the fifth Earl. He married the great heiress Janet Charteris, daughter of Colonel Francis Charteris, who had made a large fortune by gambling and was noted for the rape of Anne Bond. Their eldest son David, Lord Elcho, was implicated in the Jacobite rising of 1745, and was consequently attainted. On his father's death in 1756 he was not allowed to succeed to the peerages, but nonetheless assumed the title of Earl of Wemyss. Lord Elcho died childless and the peerages would have but for the attainder devolved upon his younger brother Francis, the soi disant seventh Earl, who nevertheless assumed the title. He assumed the surname of Charteris in lieu of Wemyss on being made heir his maternal grandfather Colonel Charteris's estate. His successor was his grandson Francis, the soi disant eighth Earl (the son of Francis Charteris, Lord Elcho).

In 1790 the family commissioned a large townhouse at 64 Queen Street, Edinburgh, a bay wider than the already large adjacent townhouses.

In 1810, upon the death of William Douglas, 4th Duke of Queensberry and 3rd Earl of March, Francis Wemyss-Charteris succeeded as fourth Earl of March, fourth Viscount of Peebles and fourth Lord Douglas of Neidpath, Lyne and Munard as the lineal heir male of the aforementioned Lady Anne Douglas, sister of the first Earl of March (see below). On his accession to these titles he assumed the surname of Charteris-Wemyss-Douglas. In 1821 he was created Baron Wemyss, of Wemyss in the County of Fife, in the Peerage of the United Kingdom. In 1826 he also obtained a reversal of the attainder of the earldom of Wemyss and became the eighth Earl of Wemyss.

He was succeeded by his son, the ninth Earl of Wemyss and fifth Earl of March. He served as Lord-Lieutenant of Peeblesshire from 1853 to 1880. When he died the titles passed to his son, the tenth Earl. He represented Gloucestershire and Haddingtonshire in the House of Commons for many years. He was succeeded by his fifth but eldest surviving son, the eleventh Earl. He sat as Conservative Member of Parliament for Haddingtonshire and Ipswich and served as Lord-Lieutenant of Haddingtonshire from 1918 to 1937.  the titles are held by the thirteenth Earl of Wemyss and ninth Earl of March, who succeeded in 2008. He is also Chief of Clan Charteris.

Several other members of the Wemyss, later Charteris, family, have also gained distinction. William Wemyss (1760–1822), son of the Hon. James Wemyss (1726–1786), third son of the fifth Earl, was a Lieutenant-General in the Army. His elder son James Erskine Wemyss (1789–1854) was a Rear-Admiral in the Royal Navy and the grandfather of Admiral of the Fleet Rosslyn Erskine-Wemyss, 1st Baron Wester Wemyss (12 April 186424 May 1933), known as Sir Rosslyn Wemyss between 1916 and 1919. William Wemyss (1790–1852), younger son of the aforementioned William Wemyss, was a Lieutenant-General in the Army. William Binfield Wemyss (1810–1890), son of James Wemyss (1778–1849), younger son of the aforementioned the Hon. James Wemyss, was a General in the Army. The Hon. Frederick William Charteris (1833–1887), third son of the ninth Earl, was a captain in the Royal Navy. The Hon. Sir Evan Edward Charteris (1864–1940), sixth son of the tenth Earl, was a historian, biographer and barrister and notably published biographies of John Singer Sargent and of Edmund Gosse. The Hon. Martin Michael Charles Charteris, second son of the aforementioned Captain Hugo Francis Charteris, Lord Elcho, eldest son of the eleventh Earl, was private secretary to Queen Elizabeth II and was created a life peer as Baron Charteris of Amisfield in 1978. Hugo Charteris (1922–1970), grandson of the eleventh Earl, was a renowned post-war novelist and screenwriter. His son, Jamie Charteris, became a successful cartoonist.

The family seat is Gosford House near Longniddry, East Lothian. The family also owns Stanway House in Gloucestershire, Neidpath Castle near Peebles and Elcho Castle near Perth.

Earls of Wemyss (1633)
John Wemyss, 1st Earl of Wemyss (died 1649)
David Wemyss, 2nd Earl of Wemyss (1610–1679)
Margaret Wemyss, 3rd Countess of Wemyss (1659–1705)
David Wemyss, 4th Earl of Wemyss (c. 1678–1720)
James Wemyss, 5th Earl of Wemyss (1699–1756)
David Wemyss, soi disant 6th Earl of Wemyss (1721–1787) (attainted 1746)
Francis Wemyss Charteris, soi disant 7th Earl of Wemyss (1723–1808)
Francis Wemyss Charteris Douglas, 8th Earl of Wemyss, 4th Earl of March (1772–1853) (restored 1826)
Francis Wemyss-Charteris, 9th Earl of Wemyss, 5th Earl of March (1795–1883)
Francis Richard Charteris, 10th Earl of Wemyss, 6th Earl of March (1818–1914)
Hugo Richard Charteris, 11th Earl of Wemyss, 7th Earl of March (1857–1937)
(Francis) David Charteris, 12th Earl of Wemyss, 8th Earl of March (1912–2008)
James Donald Charteris, 13th Earl of Wemyss, 9th Earl of March (born 1948)

The heir apparent is his only son (Francis) Richard Charteris, Lord Elcho (born 1984), a lawyer.

The next heir presumptive is the Hon. Andrew Charteris (b. 1947), elder son of Lord Charteris of Amisfield (1913–1999), younger brother of the 12th Earl. He has no issue, and his younger brother has no sons. However, there are several collateral heirs.

Earls of March (1697)
William Douglas, 1st Earl of March (c. 1665–1705)
William Douglas, 2nd Earl of March (c. 1696–1731)
William Douglas, 4th Duke of Queensberry, 3rd Earl of March (1725–1810)
Francis Wemyss Charteris Douglas, 8th Earl of Wemyss, 4th Earl of March (1772–1853)
See above for further succession

See also
Clan Charteris
Duke of Queensberry
Marquess of Queensberry
Earl of March
Earl of Ruglen
Earl of Selkirk
Baron Wester Wemyss

Notes

References
Kidd, Charles, Williamson, David (editors). Debrett's Peerage and Baronetage (1990 edition). New York: St Martin's Press, 1990,

External links

Gosford House from Gazetteer for Scotland
The Independent obituary: The Earl of Wemyss and March Monday, 15 December 2008.

Earldoms in the Peerage of Scotland
Clan Charteris
Noble titles created in 1633